Edwin Evan Miller (1883/1884 – June 7, 1949) was an American lawyer and politician from New York. Miller, well known member of the Cleveland bar, is a native of Pennsylvania and is descended from two pioneer families of Berks County, that state. This branch of the Miller family has been in Berks County for five generations, four of them born in Upper Tulpehocken Township, that county: Edwin E.; his father, Franklin S.; his grandfather, Philip; and his great grandfather, Philip. On the maternal side, Miller is descended from Michael Unger, who settled in Berks County about 1795. Franklin S. Miller was born April 4, 1857, and his wife, Selesa B. Unger, was born December 19, 1859.

Edwin E. Miller was reared in a log cabin near Shartlesville in Berks County until the family moved into the suburbs of Reading. He graduated from the Keystone State Normal School at Kutztown, Bachelor of Engineering, in 1897, and received his master's degree, Mechanical Engineer, from that institution in 1899. He graduated from Oberlin College, Bachelor of Arts, in 1906, and received his Bachelor of Laws degree from Franklin T. Backus Law School of Western Reserve University, Cleveland, 1909. In that year, he was admitted to the bar of Ohio and entered the practice of law in Cleveland.In his youth, Miller was early a wage earner, beginning as a newsboy in Reading at the age of nine and for thirteen succeeding years he was employed in other and various ways earning money with which he paid his way through college and law school. At Oberlin College, he was a member of the debating team for two years, and at the bar examination before the Supreme Court he stood first among the applicants for admission.From August 1909 until May 1918, Miller served as a deputy clerk in the Probate Court of Cuyahoga County. For three years, he was instructor of personal property, wills, domestic relation and partnerships in what was then the Rufus P. Janney Law school of this city. Since 1918, he has been an instructor in wills and evidence in the John Marshall Law School of Cleveland. He has been actively and successfully engaged in the general practice of law in association with the firm of Treadway & Marlatt.Miller was a member of the Cleveland Bar Association, an honorary member of Delta Theta Phi Law Fraternity, a member of Phi Beta Kappa, and was a member of the following Masonic bodies: Woodward Lodge No. 508, Free and Accepted Masons, Cleveland Chapter No. 148, Royal Arch Mason; Coeur deLion Commandery No. 64, Knights Templar; and Lake Erie Consistory, Scottish Rite. He is a member of the First English Lutheran Church and was active in its choir for ten years.On July 6, 1907, Miller was united in marriage with Miss Addie May Beck, of Reading, Pennsylvania, and to them have been born the following children: Norman B., born October 7, 1911; Franklin P., born June 24, 1915; Melvin E., born February 5, 1918; Charles E., born March 3, 1920.

Life
Miller practiced law in Schenectady, New York.

Miller was a member of the New York State Senate (32nd D.) from 1935 to 1938, sitting in the 158th, 159th, 160th and 161st New York State Legislatures. He was a delegate to the 1936 Republican National Convention.

Miller died in Schenectady on June 7, 1949.

Sources

 

1880s births
1949 deaths
Republican Party New York (state) state senators
Politicians from Schenectady, New York
20th-century American politicians